Sarah Lennox may refer to:

 Lady Sarah Lennox (1745–1826), daughter of Charles Lennox, 2nd Duke of Richmond, love of George III
 Sarah Lennox, Duchess of Richmond (1706–1751), daughter of William Cadogan, Lady of the Bedchamber to Queen Caroline